Eddy De Leeuw (16 June 1956 – 26 November 2015) was a Belgian sprinter. He competed in the men's 400 metres at the 1980 Summer Olympics.

References

1956 births
2015 deaths
Athletes (track and field) at the 1980 Summer Olympics
Belgian male sprinters
Olympic athletes of Belgium
Place of birth missing